= Damasei =

Town of ancient Lycia

Coordinates: 36°17′55″N 29°59′00″E

Damasei was a town of ancient Lycia.

Its site is tentatively located near modern Muskar in Asiatic Turkey.
